Earth is a 1957 Bulgarian drama film directed by Zahari Zhandov. It was entered into the 1957 Cannes Film Festival.

Cast
 Bogomil Simeonov - Enyo
 Slavka Slavova - Stanka
 Ginka Stancheva - Tzveta
 Elena Hranova - Tzveta's Mother
 Stefan Petrov - Ivan
 Kunka Baeva - Ana
 Borislav Ivanov - Bazuneka
 Nikolay Doychev - Ilcho
 Lyubomir Bobchevski
 Naicho Petrov
 Hristo Dinev
 Stefan Kuyumdzhiev
 Dimitar Peshev
 Mara Andonova
 Nikola Dadov
 Teofan Chranov
 Trifon Dzhonev

References

External links

1957 films
Bulgarian-language films
1957 drama films
Bulgarian black-and-white films
Films directed by Zahari Zhandov
Bulgarian drama films